Global Commander (known as The Armageddon Man in Europe) is a computer game developed by Martech in 1987 for the Amiga, Amstrad CPC, Atari ST, Commodore 64, and ZX Spectrum.

Gameplay
The player's goal is to become the successful Global Commander by preventing conflict between the 16 member countries of the U.N.N.  These nations possess varying levels of technological capabilities, natural resources, and missile technology. The player's nation has laser-defense  satellites to knock down missile attacks from one nation to another, as well as three "Big Bird" Reconnaissance Satellites that can detect military activity. When one nation requests or demands something from another nation, the player receives a warning; the player can also scan radio frequencies for coded messages.

Reception
Computer Gaming World criticized Global Commanders music and lack of a save option. It concluded "the game can be entertaining, but overall, the inconveniences may outweigh the advantages". A 1992 survey in the magazine of wargames with modern settings gave the game two stars out of five, stating that "it bears little resemblance to reality and has limited entertainment value", and a 1994 survey gave it one star. The game was reviewed in 1988 in Dragon #140 by Hartley, Patricia, and Kirk Lesser in "The Role of Computers" column. The reviewers gave the game 4 out of 5 stars.

Reviews
ACE (Advanced Computer Entertainment) - Nov, 1987
Your Sinclair - Oct, 1987
Commodore User - Oct, 1987
Zzap! - Nov, 1987
Computer and Video Games - Oct, 1987
ASM (Aktueller Software Markt) - Oct, 1987
The Games Machine - Jul, 1988
Computer Gaming World - Jun, 1991

References

External links
Global Commander at Atari Mania
Global Commander at Amiga Hall of Light
Global Commander at Spectrum Computing
Review in Info

1987 video games
Amiga games
Amstrad CPC games
Atari ST games
Commodore 64 games
Datasoft games
Martech games
Real-time strategy video games
Single-player video games
Video games developed in the United Kingdom
Video games scored by David Whittaker
ZX Spectrum games